The 2005–06 UCI Oceania Tour was the second season of the UCI Oceania Tour. The season began on 9 October 2005 with the Herald Sun Tour and ended on 29 January 2006 with the Trust House Cycle Classic.

The points leader, based on the cumulative results of previous races, wears the UCI Oceania Tour cycling jersey. Robert McLachlan of Australia was the defending champion of the 2005 UCI Oceania Tour. Gordon McCauley of New Zealand was crowned as the 2005–06 UCI Oceania Tour champion.

Throughout the season, points are awarded to the top finishers of stages within stage races and the final general classification standings of each of the stages races and one-day events. The quality and complexity of a race also determines how many points are awarded to the top finishers, the higher the UCI rating of a race, the more points are awarded.
The UCI ratings from highest to lowest are as follows:
 Multi-day events: 2.HC, 2.1 and 2.2
 One-day events: 1.HC, 1.1 and 1.2

Events

2005

2006

Final standings

Individual classification

Team classification

Nation classification

External links
 

UCI Oceania Tour

2006 in Oceanian sport
2005 in Oceanian sport